Askeland may refer to:

Places
Askeland, Lindås, a village in Alver municipality, Vestland county, Norway (formerly in Lindås municipality, Hordaland county, Norway)
Askeland, Radøy, a village in Alver municipality, Vestland county, Norway (formerly in Radøy municipality, Hordaland county, Norway)
Askeland, Osterøy, a village in Osterøy municipality, Vestland county, Norway

People
Edvard Askeland, a Norwegian jazz musician